Black Rock is a summit in Mineral County, West Virginia, in the United States.

Black Rock appears black when viewed from afar, hence the name.

References

Mountains of Mineral County, West Virginia
Mountains of West Virginia